My Life's on the Line, known as 60 Second Assassin in the West, is a 1978 Taiwanese martial arts film directed by Chester Wong and starring Bryan Leung, Dean Shek and Man Lee-pang.

Plot
Hired killer 'Minute Fong' is so-called throughout the kung fu world for his ability to beat an opponent in under a minute. With such an effective technique, Fong naturally gains an unnerving reputation throughout China. The killer is beginning to rethink the actions of his life though and sees the next few jobs as definitely being his last. After his girlfriend commits suicide, he finds his priorities in life changing even though his employer, Chow Sau-tung, promises him rich rewards for obedience. Fong agrees to take one final assignment; to kill a man named Lai in a specified town. The obvious catch is that the town is inhabited by scores of men with this name and therefore the assassin must carefully search out his target. While staying in the designated location, Fong befriends a local boy who proves to be a mischievous, yet good-hearted youngster who is merely looking for a father figure. Over time, the supreme fighter agrees to teach the boy kung fu so that he can defend himself and the rest of his family. As the master-student bond develops, so does the friendship between Fong and the youngster's mother and grandfather. Fully immersed in this ordinary life, the killer forgets his assignment, but is quickly reminded of it when he discovers who Lai really is. Now Minute Fong must decide whether his loyalty lies with his new friends or his ruthless employers.

Cast
Bryan Leung as Chow Sau-tung
Dean Shek as Master "Handsome"
Man Lee-pang as Minute Fong Chin
Wong Chi-sang as Fong's first victim
Wong Wing-sang as Fong's second victim
Lung Fei as Yang Kuei
Su Chen-ping as Old Man Lai
Wong Man-chuen as Ying Ying
Yuen Fong
Chim Lung
Siu Boon
Wong Yue-hong
Kong Ching-ha as Fong's mother (cameo)
Sit Hon as Fong's father (cameo)
Woo Hon-keung
Choi Chung-chau
Clement Yip
Lee Lung-yam as Servant
Au Lap-bo as Waiter
Pui Bik
Chek Bau
Tang Keung-mei
Tang Keung-ying

References

External links 

 

1978 films
Taiwanese action films
Taiwanese martial arts films
Kung fu films
Mandarin-language films
1970s action films
1978 martial arts films
Films about contract killing